Rocking Tall is a compilation album by the American rock band Warrant, released through Sony music in 1996. The collection spans the band's history from 1989 through 1992; although it does not include "Heaven", one of the band's most popular songs.

Release
Rocking Tall was released in conjunction with The Best of Warrant, both albums released in the same year roughly one month apart: The Best of Warrant was released April 2, 1996 and Rocking Tall May 13, 1996. Rocking Tall featured as a second disc/alternate version to The Best of Warrant.

Track listing

Personnel 
 Jani Lane - vocals
 Joey Allen - guitar
 Erik Turner - guitar
 Jerry Dixon - bass
 Steven Sweet - drums
 Beau Hill - keyboards

References

External links 
 Warrant Official Site
 Classic Warrant Videos on Sony BMG MusicBox

1996 compilation albums
Warrant (American band) albums